The Friar Society is the oldest honor society at the University of Texas at Austin.

Origins
The Friar Society was founded in 1911 by Curtice Rosser and Marion Levy. Eight members were initially selected in the charter group. Originally, four men were chosen from the junior and senior classes every year on the basis of a significant contribution to The University of Texas.

Twenty-five years later, the Friars decided to start taking larger classes to accommodate the growing size of the university. Women were first admitted to the Friar Society on March 25, 1973.

In April 2011, the Friar Society celebrated the 100 year anniversary of its founding.

Friar Centennial Teaching Fellowship
The Friar Centennial Teaching Fellowship is an annual award given to a UT professor who has demonstrated excellence at the undergraduate teaching level. With a prize of $25,000, the award is the largest monetary award annually given to a UT professor.

In 1982, the Friars decided to create a teaching fellowship in honor of the upcoming centennial celebration for The University of Texas. Friar alumni raised $100,000 for this purpose, and this amount was matched by the Board of Regents to create an endowment.

In 2006, the Friar Society also created the Tany Norwood Award to honor one staff member or administrator a year.

Notable alumni
Beauford H. Jester, 36th Governor of Texas
Allan Shivers, 37th Governor of Texas
John Connally, 38th Governor of Texas, Secretary of the Navy, Secretary of the Treasury
Dolph Briscoe, 41st Governor of Texas, largest single landowner in Texas
Lloyd Doggett, current United States Representative
Frank Ikard, former United States Representative
J.J. Pickle, former United States Representative
Ed Gossett, former United States Representative
John J. Bell, former United States Representative
Jack B. Brooks, former United States Representative serving for more than 40 years
Diane Wood, current Circuit Judge, U.S. Court of Appeals for the Seventh Circuit
Joe Greenhill, former Texas Supreme Court Justice
John Hill, former Texas Attorney General and former Chief Justice of the Texas Supreme Court
Harry Lee Hudspeth, current United States Federal Judge
George P. Kazen, current Senior United States Federal Judge
Ben Connally, former United States Federal Judge
Harold Barefoot Sanders, former United States Federal Judge
George Prescott Bush, Texas Land Commissioner and nephew of George W. Bush 
Ray Farabee, former Texas State Senator and President President Pro Tempore of the Texas State Senate 
Cyndi Taylor Krier, former Texas State Senator 
Tim Von Dohlen, former Texas State House Representative
Roberto R. Alonzo, current Texas State House Representative 
Stanley Louis McLelland, former United States Ambassador to Jamaica
Peter Coneway, former United States Ambassador to Switzerland
Wilson Homer Elkins, President of the University of Maryland, 1954–1978
Benno C. Schmidt Sr., American lawyer and venture capitalist
Robert Keeton, lawyer, jurist, and legal scholar
Barr McClellan, former lawyer and author
Ricardo Romo, President of the University of Texas at San Antonio
Roy Spence, founder and CEO of GSD&M Idea City
Steve Poizner, California State Insurance Commissioner, billionaire entrepreneur
Earl Campbell, Hall of Fame NFL running back
Mark McKinnon, Republican political advisor
Bryan Garner, current editor of Black's Law Dictionary
Darren Walker, President of the [Ford Foundation]
Paul Begala, political consultant and commentator
Major Applewhite, football coach and former Texas quarterback
Will Licon, American swimmer
Cat Osterman, American softball player.
Doug Dawson, former National Football League offensive lineman
Roosevelt Leaks, former National Football League running back 
Patrick Rose, youngest member of the Texas House of Representatives
Mary Walsh, National Security Producer at CBS News
Bob Armstrong, Former Under Secretary of Interior, Former Texas Land Commissioner
Sam Acho. American football linebacker for the Arizona Cardinals
Lindsey Carmichael, Paralympic Bronze Medalist
Linda Addison, Lawyer, business executive and author
Michael L Gillette, Historian, nonprofit executive
Willie Morris, the youngest Editor-in-Chief of Harper's Magazine
Robert Schenkkan, Pulitzer Prize for Theater, Tony Award for Best Play, two-time Emmy Award nominee
James Talarico, represents House District 52 in the Texas House of Representatives

See also
Collegiate secret societies in North America

References

External links
"The Friar Society"

Collegiate secret societies
Student organizations established in 1911
1911 establishments in Texas
Youth organizations based in Texas